The Czech Republic men's national squash team represents Czech Republic in international squash team competitions, and is governed by Czech Squash Association.

Current team
 Jan Koukal
 Petr Martin
 Ondrej Ertl
 Ondrej Uherka
 Daniel Mekbib

Results

World Team Squash Championships

European Squash Team Championships

See also 
 Czech Squash Association
 World Team Squash Championships

References 

Squash teams
Men's national squash teams
Squash
Men's sport in the Czech Republic